Central Musical Theatre Company is an amateur theatre company based in Derby, England. It is affiliated to Central United Reformed Church, the National Operatic and Dramatic Association and Derby New Theatre Association.

History
The society was founded in Derby in 1932 when members of Normanton Road Congregational Church decided to present an opera entitled "Cupid and The Ogre" to raise money for church funds. The first performance took place on 11 January 1933. It was so successful that an Operatic Section was formed to perform a show on an annual basis. Following the 1939 production of Gretchen, World War II called a halt to things and the Society did not resume until 1953 leading to the staging of Highwayman Love in 1954. The society thrived and shows became so successful that it was clear larger, more accessible venues for performances must be found. This necessity led to a move to Derby Guildhall in 1973 for the production of Viva Mexico

In 1980, following the amalgamation of three churches, the society was renamed Central Operatic Society. Success continued, leading to a further change of venue for the main annual production.  In 1997 Funny Girl was performed in the auditorium of Landau Forte College, Derby. Following the great success of the 2013 production, Little Shop of Horrors, restrictions imposed by the college meant that another change of venue was needed, this time to The Robert Ludlam Theatre at St Benedicts School, Derby.

In 2015, the society felt as if the inclusion of "operatic" in the societies name was no longer appropriate regarding the societies modern traditions of performing in diversely-themed musical theatre and concert. Therefore, they decided to rename themselves to Central Musical Theatre Company (commonly abbreviated to CMTC).

In order to strengthen its financial security the society expanded its range of productions to include concerts, murder mysteries and one act plays, some of which have been written by members themselves. These are performed in addition to the annual major musical which is still staged in March each year.

The society has raised many thousands of pounds over the years for the Church to use for its own charitable purposes. Membership is not restricted to church members and the entire company enjoy many functions alongside the Church throughout the year.

Notable past members
The society has the reputation of promoting young talent and provides an excellent environment for young performers to practise and demonstrate their skills. Former members who have gone on to develop successful careers in the performing arts world include Peter Wedd (opera), Jonathon Penton (musical theatre), Kevin Fountain (vocal coaching and performance) and Kelli Young who was a founding member of the pop group Liberty X.

Awards
For a relatively small city, Derby has a vibrant amateur theatre scene and all productions are of an exceptionally high standard. Successes are celebrated annually at 'The Eagle Awards', presented at a ceremony hosted by Derby Theatre. Central Musical Theatre Company has received several awards over the years:

Best Production of a Musical:

1998 - Jesus Christ Superstar;

2001 - My Fair Lady;

2012 - The Drowsy Chaperone;

2013 - Little Shop of Horrors

Outstanding Achievement:

2006 - 'The Chorus' in Chess

Best Performance by an Actor in a Musical:

2012 - Nigel Taylor, The Man in the Chair (The Drowsy Chaperone);

2013 - Craig Arme, Seymour Krelborne (Little Shop of Horrors)

2015 - Adrian Redfern, The Lion (The Wizard of Oz)

2016 - Rachael Wyatt, The Witch (Into the Woods)

The 2005 production of Calamity Jane won the NODA Regional Award for 'Best Production of a Musical'. Little Shop of Horrors was nominated in the same category for 2013 (to be awarded June 2014).

Recent productions
March 2017 saw the society present the Musical Theatre adaption of Jekyll and Hyde (originally a late 19th century novella written by Robert Louis Stevenson). This production, which featured several new members, received critical acclaim from attendees, and the local press.

Current projects
The company is currently preparing for a concert entitled 'Here Comes Summer' which will be performed on 28–30 June in venues across the city of Derby. It will feature well known songs themed on the summer season, and activities commonly associated with it. The songs in question will be from musicals, films, and the charts. This is a charity concert and some of the proceeds will go to a charity that is yet to be announced. In February 2018, the society will be presenting Kiss Me Kate.

External links
Central Operatic Society
Central United Reformed Church
National Operatic and Dramatic Association
Landau Forte College
Derby Theatre
Peter Wedd

Companies based in Derby
British opera companies
Musical groups established in 1932